Mugad is a village in Dharwad district of Karnataka, India.

Demographics 
As of the 2011 Census of India there were 1,027 households in Mugad and a total population of 5,085 consisting of 2,630 males and 2,455 females. There were 649 children ages 0-6.

References

Villages in Dharwad district